Amata johanna is a moth of the family Erebidae. It was described by Arthur Gardiner Butler in 1876. It is found in Nigeria and South Africa.

References

 Arctiidae genus list at Butterflies and Moths of the World of the Natural History Museum

Johann
Moths of Africa
Moths described in 1876